Ricardo Jorge Silva Barreiros (born Sintra, 17 January 1982) is a Portuguese roller hockey player. He plays as a midfielder and as a forward. He's considered one of the best roller hockey players of nowadays.

Career
Barreiros played first at CD Paço d'Arcos, being promoted to the first category in 2001/02. He was assigned for Benfica for the season of 2004/2005. He played four seasons for the "Eagles" rink hockey team but never won the National Championship. He moved to Liceo da Coruña, in Spain, where he played from 2009/10 to 2011/12. Barreiros returned to Portugal to play for FC Porto in 2012/13.

Barreiros is a usual player for Portugal, having his first game in 2003. He played in the Rink Hockey World Championship, in 2005, 2007, 2009, 2011 and 2013, and in the Rink Hockey European Championship, in 2004, 2006, 2008, 2010 and 2012. He achieved his greatest success by now at the 2008 Rink Hockey European Championship, where Portugal reached the 2nd place, losing narrowly the final to Spain by 1-0. He was also the top scorer of the competition with 10 goals.

External links

Ricardo Barreiros Profile

1982 births
Living people
Portuguese roller hockey players
People from Sintra
Sportspeople from Lisbon District